Piet Kruiver (5 January 1938 – 18 March 1989) was a Dutch footballer who was active as a striker. Kruiver made his professional debut at PSV Eindhoven and also played for Lanerossi Vicenza, Feyenoord and DWS.

Honours

Club
Feyenoord
 Eredivisie: 1964–65
 KNVB Cup: 1964–65

Individual
 Eredivisie top scorer: 1965–66

References

 Profile

1938 births
1989 deaths
Dutch footballers
Netherlands international footballers
Footballers from Zaanstad
Dutch expatriate footballers
Feyenoord players
PSV Eindhoven players
L.R. Vicenza players
AFC DWS players
Association football forwards
Eredivisie players
Serie A players
Expatriate footballers in Italy
Dutch expatriate sportspeople in Italy